The Regionalbahn (lit. Regional train; abbreviated RB) is a type of local passenger train (stopping train) in Germany. It is similar to the Regionalzug (R) and Regio (R) train categories in neighboring Austria and Switzerland, respectively.

Service
Regionalbahn trains usually call at all stations on a given line, with the exception of RB trains within S-Bahn networks - these may only call at selected stations. Thus, they rank below the Regional-Express train, which regularly stops only at selected stations on its route.

Operators
RB trains are subject to franchising by the federal states of Germany; whilst many RB trains are still operated by DB Regio, the local traffic division of the former monopolist Deutsche Bahn, franchises often go to other companies, like Abellio Deutschland, Eurobahn or Transdev Germany.

There is no obligation to use the term Regionalbahn for basic local services; some private rail operators therefore use their own names to denote their trains.

Stock
RB services make use of vastly different types of rolling stock; on electrified lines, double-deck cars or EMUs may be used, DMUs like the Bombardier Talent.

See also
List of regional rail lines in North Rhine-Westphalia
Train categories in Europe
Regional rail

References

Passenger rail transport in Germany
Regional rail in Germany